Gęsice may refer to the following places in Poland:
Gęsice, Lower Silesian Voivodeship (south-west Poland)
Gęsice, Świętokrzyskie Voivodeship (south-central Poland)